Copelatus erichsonii is a species of diving beetle. It is part of the genus Copelatus of the subfamily Copelatinae in the family Dytiscidae. It was described by Félix Édouard Guérin-Méneville in 1849.

References

erichsonii
Beetles described in 1849